Oncidium forbesii is a species of orchid native to southeastern Brazil.

References

External links 

forbesii
Endemic orchids of Brazil